Saddle Lake is a First Nations community in central Alberta.  It is located on Saddle Lake Cree Nation 125 and is governed by the Saddle Lake Cree Nation.

References

External links 
 

Localities on Indian reserves in Alberta
Cree